Calodesma contracta is a moth of the family Erebidae. It was described by Francis Walker in 1854. It is found in South America.

References

Calodesma
Moths described in 1854